Rowdy & MLA is a 1991 Indian Kannada-language crime action film directed by Om Sai Prakash who also wrote a fresh screenplay for the original story by P. Vasu. The film is a remake of the Tamil film Velai Kidaichuduchu (1990), which was directed by P. Vasu. The film stars Ambareesh and Malashri. T

The film's music was composed by Hamsalekha and the audio was launched on the Lahari Music banner.

Cast 
Ambareesh
Malashri 
Jaggesh
Srinath
Jai Jagadish
Mukhyamantri Chandru
Sihi Kahi Chandru
Rambo Rocky
Bank Janardhan
Mohanapriya
Annapoorna

Soundtrack 

The music of the film was composed and lyrics written by Hamsalekha.

References 

1991 films
1990s Kannada-language films
Politics in fiction
Indian crime action films
Films scored by Hamsalekha
Kannada remakes of Tamil films
1990s crime action films
Political action films
Films directed by Sai Prakash